"What's Your Flava?" is a song by British singer Craig David. It was released on 28 October 2002 as the first single from his second studio album Slicker Than Your Average (2002). It peaked at number eight on the UK Singles Chart. Despite only peaking at number 104 on the US Billboard Hot 100, a much lower position than previous singles "Fill Me In" and "7 Days", it was included on the soundtrack for the 2003 American film What a Girl Wants.

In 2003, the song was used in a commercial for Mattel's highly unsuccessful Flavas dolls. In 2007, an edited and condensed version of the song was used for Popeyes Chicken commercials. There is a remix, featuring American rapper Twista.

Chart performance
The single charted at  8 in the United Kingdom, tying with the previous single, "Rendezvous". It also charted at No. 9 in Canada, No. 10 in Australia, No. 22 in the Republic of Ireland and No. 4 on the Billboard Bubbling Under Hot 100 chart in the United States.

Music video
The music video for "What's Your Flava?" was filmed in the Czech Republic and was directed by Little X. It is a parody of the 1971 film Willy Wonka & the Chocolate Factory. The video sees David offering a chance for four girls (one from New York City, one from Paris, one from London and one from Toronto) to win a tour around his music factory if they find golden CDs hidden inside his new album Slicker Than Your Average. Then, three girls are eliminated one by one because, as with the film, they act up during the tour. One girl (the girl from Toronto) remains and leaves with David via a glass elevator exiting the factory, similar to the ending of the film.

Track listings
Australia CD single
 "What's Your Flava?" – 3:39
 "Four Times a Lady" – 5:30
 "What's Your Flava?" (instrumental) – 4:40

United Kingdom CD single
 "What's Your Flava?" – 3:39
 "Four Times a Lady" – 4:30
 "What's Your Flava?" (instrumental) – 4:41

United States vinyl EP
 A1.  "What's Your Flava?" (Radio Edit)
 A2.  "What's Your Flava?" (Instrumental)
 A3.  "What's Your Flava?" (A Capella)
 B1.  "What's Your Flava?" (Todd's Underground Flava Mix: 2) Remix – Todd Edwards
 B2.  "What's Your Flava?" (Todd's Underground Flava Mix: 1) Remix – Todd Edwards
 C1.  "What's Your Flava?" (Ford's Rewinder Club Remix) Remix – Ford
 C2.  "What's Your Flava?" (Ford's Rewinder Club Dub) Remix – Ford
 D1.  "What's Your Flava?" (Akufen's Club Mix) Remix – Akufen
 D2. "What's Your Flava?" (Akufen's Dub Mix)

Charts

Weekly charts

Year-end charts

Certifications

Release history

References

2002 singles
2002 songs
Atlantic Records singles
Craig David songs
Songs written by Craig David